Scott Deerwester (born 1956) is one of the inventors of latent semantic analysis. He was a member of the faculty of the Colgate University, University of Chicago and the Hong Kong University of Science and Technology. He moved to Hong Kong in 1991, where he worked in the humanitarian sector.

References

Living people
1956 births